The women's 3000 metres steeplechase event at the 2006 African Championships in Athletics was held at the Stade Germain Comarmond in Mauritius on August 11.

Results

References
Results 

2006 African Championships in Athletics
Steeplechase at the African Championships in Athletics
2006 in women's athletics